Syedna  Tayyeb Zainuddin Bin Syedi Jivanjee  (born: 1782 AD; died on 15 Zilqad al-Haraam 1252 AH/1836 AD, Surat, India) was the 45th Da'i al-Mutlaq of the Dawoodi Bohra sect. He succeeded his brother, the 44th Da'i, Syedna Mohammed Ezzuddin Bin Syedi Jivanjee, to the religious post at the age of 38 years.

 Dai period: 1236–1252 AH/1821–1836 AD
 Place of da'i office: Surat, India
 Death: 15th Zilqad al-Haraam, 1252 AH
 Mawazeen: Syedi SheikhAdam Safiyuddin, Syedi Hebatullah Jamaluddin
 Mukasir: Mohammed Badruddin

Family
His father's name was Syedi Jivanjee bin Shaikh Dawood bhai while his mother's name was Buji BaiSaheba binte Mulla Ahmed-ji. He was the elder brother of the previous Da'i (Mohammed Ezzuddin). Buji BaiSaheba's father was the grandson of Syedi Abdul Qadir Hakimuddin while her mother Aamena BaiSaheba was the great-grand-daughter of Syedi Hasanji Badshah, a descendant of Syedi Fakhruddin Shaheed.

Accession
Tayyeb Zainuddin became Da'i al-Mutlaq in 1236 AH/1821 AD. His period of Dawat was 1821–1836 AD/1236-1252 AH.

Death
He died at age of 54. The present Da'i descends from him.

References

External links
The Ismaili, their history and doctrine by Farhad Daftary (Chapter -Mustalian Ismailism- p. 300-310)

Dawoodi Bohra da'is
1782 births
1836 deaths
19th-century Ismailis